Săcueni (Seklhid), often spelled Săcuieni, is a town in Bihor County, Romania. It administers five villages: Cadea (Kágya), Ciocaia (Csokaly), Cubulcut (Érköbölkút), Olosig (Érolaszi) and Sânnicolau de Munte (Hegyközszentmiklós).

Geography
It is located around 42 km north-east of Oradea, in the proximity of the Hungarian border in Bihor County, Crișana, Romania.

History
The first written record of the town's name dates back to 1217. Then its name arose in 1278 as Zekulhyd and in 1325 as  Zekulhyda whose meaning is bridge of Székely in Hungarian, and according to a legend, Székelys were settled down here to guard the bridge of Ér as early as the 10th century.

In 1417, Hungarian king Sigismund gave Székelyhíd the right of organizing a fair. Soon afterwards,  it also got the right that the fair to be weekly scheduled. In 1514, it was occupied by György Dózsa's army and then in 1661, it was also occupied by the Ottoman army.  As a condition of the peace treaty of Vasvár, the town's castle was destroyed in 1665. From 1691 it was part of the Habsburg monarchy up until the Austro-Hungarian Compromise of 1867. Thereafter  it became part of the Kingdom of Hungary within Austria-Hungary.

After break-up of Austria-Hungary in 1918/1920, the town became part of Romania. As a result of the Second Vienna Award it returned to Hungary between 1940 and 1945. Since then it has been part of Romania.

Population

According to the last census from 2011 there were 11,113  people living within the city.

Of this population, 77.49% are ethnic Hungarians, while 15.7% are ethnic Romani, 6.62% Romanians and 0.17% others.

Historical Monuments

References

Populated places in Bihor County
Localities in Crișana
Towns in Romania
Hungary–Romania border crossings